The Fukuda/Hitachi HT-3 glider was a detailed 3/5 scale model of a proposed airliner, the Hitachi HT-3. Aerodynamic data gathered under tow was expected to be more reliable than that from wind tunnel testing.

Design and development

Until the development of high pressure wind tunnels the aerodynamics of models and full scale structures could differ markedly because of the much higher Reynolds number of the latter. To avoid possible problems the Aviation Bureau, who were sponsoring Hitachi's eight seat civil airliner, asked Fukuda to build a towed, 3/5 scale glider to investigate the design's aerodynamics. The modelling was detailed, including the glazing of the cockpit, the twin inline engine nacelles and the retracted landing gear.

The glider had a wooden structure, covered with plywood and fabric. It was flown from within the enclosed model cockpit, though by only one pilot rather than the two who would have piloted the full sale airliner. After measurements had been made the glider was released from the tow and landed normally.

Its first flight was made on 17 December 1940, piloted by Isamu Oda who was a well known glider pilot. It is not known how many more flights were made before the HT-3, still at the mock-up stage, was abandoned as Japanese aircraft development refocused on military aviation.

Specifications

References

External links
 
 

Glider aircraft
Japanese experimental aircraft
1940s Japanese civil aircraft